Željka Radanović is a Montenegrin football defender who plays for Spartak Subotica in the Serbian First League She has played the Champions League with Mašinac Niš and Spartak.

References

1989 births
Living people
Montenegrin women's footballers
Expatriate women's footballers in Serbia
Women's association football defenders
Montenegro women's international footballers
ŽFK Spartak Subotica players
ŽFK Mašinac PZP Niš players